Tom Doyle Lake is a lake located in Newbold, within Oneida County, Wisconsin. The lake is 108 acres in size with a maximum depth of 30 feet.

References 

 

Lakes of Oneida County, Wisconsin